Jennifer Cook (formerly O'Toole) (born October 24, 1975) is an American author and speaker. She is known for her six Asperkids books, which have been translated into six languages and include the winner of the Autism Society of America's Book of the Year Award. Her memoir Autism in Heels: The Untold Story of a Female Life on the Spectrum is a Wall Street Journal Bestseller, a "Best Book" title winner by Publishers Weekly, and named a "Best Memoir" and one of both the "Best Autism Books of All Time" and "Best-Selling Autism Books of All Time" by BookAuthority. She is the on-camera autism expert in Netflix's series "Love on the Spectrum US."

Cook was diagnosed with Asperger syndrome in 2011; all three of her children have also been diagnosed with the condition. In 2019, she became the inaugural Senior Directorial Consultant for Jefferson University Hospitals Jefferson Health Center for Autism and Neurodiversity in Philadelphia, and was selected to address the United States' National Institutes of Health Interagency Autism Coordinating Committee regarding the unique issues surrounding women, girls, and autism. Cook advised the President's Council on Disabilities and President's Council on Sports, Fitness, and Nutrition at the White House in 2015, and, as an Advisor to the Sesame Workshop, has a voice in the development of Julia, the first autistic character on Sesame Street and their "See the Amazing in Every Child" initiative.

She is a featured contributor in Dr. Tony Atwood's Top Aspie Mentors: Been There, Done That and Autism & Learning Differences, and wrote the forewords to Dragonfly: A Daughter's Emergence from Autism: A Practical Guide for Parents and Easy to Love, Hard to Live With. Cook sits on the Autism Society of America's Council of Autistic Advisors, is a columnist/expert panelist for Amy Poehler's Smart Girls, Autism Asperger's Digest, Zoom Autism Magazine, AuKids Magazine, Special Magazine, and the Journal for the North American Montessori Teachers' Association NAMTA, and is a commentator on National Public Radio's WHYY and WFAE as well as Fox's WTXF-TV and NBC's Charlotte Today.

Background
Cook was born in Glen Ridge, New Jersey, and grew up in West Caldwell. She is the only child of Joseph (d. 2007) and Jane Cook. Her father was an international commercial litigator. Her mother served as the only woman on their town council for 12 years.

Cook began dancing at age two, continuing through college. At seven, she became a member of Mensa.  Cook attended Brown University, where she was a member of Kappa Alpha Theta. She majored in American Civilization, graduating with high honors in 1997. She was hired as a counselor in the Domestic Violence Unit of the Charlotte-Mecklenburg Police Department in Charlotte, NC. In this capacity, she trained officers, led student-focused presentations in colleges and high schools, and served as a victim advocate. In 1999, Cook began Master's work at the Graduate School of Social Work at Columbia University in New York City.  After Columbia, she enrolled at the Graduate School of Education at Queens University of Charlotte, while teaching language arts at both the middle school and high school levels. In her first term, she garnered a student-initiated nomination for Disney's American Teacher of the Year Award.

Personal life 
Cook has three children from her first marriage. She was divorced in 2018 and remarried on Christmas Day, 2019. She and her family live near Charlotte, North Carolina. In addition to Asperger syndrome, she has synesthesia.

Bibliography

Asperkids series
 Asperkids: An Insider's Guide to Loving, Understanding and Teaching Children with Asperger Syndrome (2012, Jessica Kingsley Pub) 
 The Asperkids' (Secret) Book of Social Rules: The Handbook of Not-So- Obvious Guidelines for Teens and Tweens (2012, Jessica Kingsley Publishers) 
 The Asperkid's Launch Pad: Home Design That Empowers Everyday Superheroes(2013, Jessica Kingsley Publishers) 
 The Asperkid's Not-Your-Average-Coloring Book (2013, Jessica Kingsley Publishers) 
 The Asperkid's Game Plan: Purposeful Play, Extraordinary Minds.... Ordinary Stuff (2014, Jessica Kingsley Pub)

Other books
 Sisterhood of the Spectrum: An Asperger Chick's Guide to Life (2015, Jessica Kingsley Publishers) 
 Autism in Heels: The Untold Story of a Female Life on the Spectrum (2018, Skyhorse Publishers)

Contributions
 Foreword for Dragonfly: A Daughter's Emergence from Autism: A Practical Guide for Parents by Lori Ashley Taylor  (2018, Skyhorse Publishers)
 Foreword for Easy to Love but Hard to Live With: Real People, Invisible Disabilities, True Stories edited by Lisa Davis  (2014, DRT Press) 
 Featured 'World's Top Aspie Mentors' contributor for Been There. Done That. Try This!: An Aspie's Guide to Life on Earth edited by Tony Attwood (2014, Jessica Kingsley Publishers) 
 Featured contributor for Autism and Learning Differences: An Active Learning, Teaching Toolkit by Michael P. MacMannon, with a foreword by Stephen Shore (2015, Jessica Kingsley Publishers)

Podcast
 Speaking Geek: Translating Typical for the Human Spectrum

Awards and honors
 BookAuthority: 74 Best Autism Books of All Time
Publishers Weekly: Best Books List
 Booklist Book of Distinction Starred Review by the American Library Association
24 Amazing Feminist Books of 2018, Book Riot, 2018
 Outstanding Literary Work of the Year, Autism Society of America, 2014
 50 Most Influential Women in North Carolina, 2014
 25 Most Amazing Autistic Women, Autistic Spectrum Digest, August 2014
Temple Grandin Award for Outstanding Global Contributions, Future Horizons
 Women Inspiring Strength & Hope Award, Make-A-Wish
 GRASP Excellence in Parenting/Distinguished Spectrumite
 AuKids Speaker of the Year
 Leading Woman, The Kappa Alpha Theta Leading Women Award (2013)
 Disney's Babble: Top 30 Autism Spectrum Blogs 2013 
 Disney's Babble: Top 30 Autism Facebook Fan Pages 2013 
 Disney's Babble: Top 30 Autism Websites
 Godiva's Woman of the Year, Nominee

References

External links 
Author website
 
Instagram

1975 births
Writers from New Jersey
Living people
Brown University alumni
Mensans
People from Glen Ridge, New Jersey
People from West Caldwell, New Jersey
People with Asperger syndrome
21st-century American non-fiction writers
American non-fiction children's writers